Whataburger is an American regional fast food restaurant chain, headquartered and based in San Antonio, Texas, that specializes in hamburgers. The company, founded by Harmon Dobson and Paul Burton, opened its first restaurant in Corpus Christi, Texas, in 1950. Family-owned by the Dobsons until 2019, the chain is now managed by a private equity firm along with the Dobson family still holding a small stake.

There are more than 670 locations in Texas and over 150 in New Mexico, Arizona, Colorado, and the Southern United States, of which 126 are franchised.

Whataburger was known for many years for its distinct A-framed orange-and-white-stripe-roofed buildings (a maroon stripe is added in College Station and a crimson stripe is added in Norman). The first A-frame restaurant was built in Odessa, Texas, in 1961 and was the 24th Whataburger to open and was a historical landmark. The site was demolished in 2019 and a new building was built.

The company's focus is on ground beef burgers, and include the "Whataburger", the "Whataburger Jr.", the "Triple Meat Whataburger",  the "Bacon & Cheese Whataburger", and the "Justaburger". Also available are non-beef options such as the "Whatachick'n". Breakfast is served during morning hours, including biscuits, pork sausage, bacon, and eggs.

History

Early years
In 1950, Harmon Dobson and Paul Burton were looking to open a hamburger restaurant. Dobson's goal was to "make a better burger that took two hands to hold and tasted so good that when you took a bite you would say 'What a burger!'" In June 1950, Dobson was granted the Whataburger trademark. In August of that year they opened their first location on Ayers Street in Corpus Christi, Texas, across from Del Mar College. The store sold burgers for 25 cents, and also sold drinks and chips.

In 1951, Burton and Dobson ended their partnership after arguments concerning Dobson's price raise of the burger from 25 to 30 cents. Burton settled with owning the Whataburger franchises in San Antonio, Texas. Months later, prices for burgers were raised to 35 cents. In 1952, Dobson opened a location in Kingsville, Texas, the first store outside of Corpus Christi. In 1953, Joe Andrews, Sr. became the first non-founder franchise owner with a location in Alice, Texas. In 1959, the first Whataburger restaurant outside Texas opened in Pensacola, Florida.

1960s and 1970s
By 1960, there were stores operating across Texas, Florida, and Tennessee. Inspired by his love for flying, Dobson designed the orange and white striped A-frame store in Odessa, Texas, in 1961.

In 1962, the company added French fries and hot pies to its menu. In 1963, it expanded to Arizona and totaled 26 stores. In 1965, it estimated selling 15,000 burgers daily in the Texas Coastal Bend area. In 1967, the company commissioned the "Flying W" company logo, and the company had expanded to 40 restaurants in four states.

On April 11, 1967, Dobson and an associate died in an airplane crash, and Dobson's widow, Grace, took control of the business. In 1969, Grace became chairman of the board.

In 1971, the company opened its first drive-through store, and in 1972, it opened its 100th store. In 1974, the A-frame design was changed to a "Modern A-Frame" to accommodate drive-thrus and larger dining rooms.

1980s and 1990s
In 1980, the company opened its 300th store. In 1982, three Corpus Christi stores began 24/7 service. In 1983, the company added Breakfast on a Bun, the Whatachick'n sandwich and breakfast taquitos to its menu. In 1987, it opened its 400th store, and also shut down operations in California.

In 1993, Harmon and Grace Dobson's son, Tom, became the CEO and President. The menu expanded, offering Whatameal packages, cookies and biscuits, and chicken strips. The company celebrated its 500th store opening in 1995, and was noted as the country's eighth-largest hamburger chain.

On May 6, 1999, the company opened "Whataburger by the Bay" on Shoreline Blvd in Corpus Christi. The site includes a life-size bronze statue of Harmon Dobson.

A Whataburger facility, complete with familiar a-frame design and the company logo, appeared routinely in the popular animated TV series King of the Hill.

2000–present
On August 8, 2000, Whataburger celebrated its 50th anniversary with 575 operating stores. In 2001, during the 77th Texas Legislative Session, a bill was passed proclaiming Whataburger to be a Texas Treasure. 

In 2003, it hired Austin-based advertising firm McGarrah Jessee, which created an advertising campaign featuring the gravelly voice of Ohio actor William Bassett. In 2007, the company achieved 700 stores in ten states with annual revenue of $1 billion.

In October 2011, the company changed its television ads from Bassett's voiceovers to "documentary-style ads employees and customers using their own words to describe what makes Whataburger special." By the end of the year, it had 728 stores operating in ten states. The Dobson family owned 611 stores, and the other "117 are owned and operated by about 25 franchisees."

On May 16, 2019 American City Business Journals reported that Whataburger confirmed it has hired Morgan Stanley for a possible sale of the company.

On June 14, 2019, the Dobson family sold its majority stake in the company to BDT Capital, a Chicago-based investment company. The companies cited long term expansion plans as one reason for the sale. Much of the current leadership will remain, but they will take on new roles within the company. Ed Nelson, currently serving as chief financial officer and controller, was promoted to president. The company said that Whataburger's headquarters will remain in San Antonio.

On August 1, 2020, Ed Nelson was promoted to CEO of Whataburger.

Beginning in 2021, the company expanded to the Midwest with locations around the Kansas City metropolitan area and the Wichita, Kansas metropolitan area, with multiple locations in between the cities. On January 5, 2022, the first of 8 locations in Middle Tennessee opened in Hermitage, ending a decades long absence in the Nashville area.

In March 2022, Whataburger announced it would be opening locations in the Atlanta metropolitan area. The first one opened in November in Kennesaw.

Retail products
Due to the success of selling Whataburger sauces at H-E-B since 2014, the company announced it will offer 1-pound packages of bacon at H-E-B and Central Market stores.

Whataburger sells its line of condiments in 14oz and 20oz squeeze bottles. It also sells jars of its picante sauce and salsa verde, as well as boxed pancake mix.

Corporate affairs

Headquarters and offices
In 2009 the company moved from its long time base in Corpus Christi to a new headquarters at 300 Concord Plaza Drive, a  building in San Antonio. 

Previously the corporate headquarters were in Corpus Christi. With the regional offices' in Corpus Christi, Houston, Irving, and Phoenix. 

After Hurricane Ike hit the Texas Coast in 2008, the company began considering moving its headquarters from Corpus Christi. On Friday November 21, 2008, the company announced it was permanently moving the headquarters to San Antonio, and that the current Corpus Christi office would remain open indefinitely to help ease the transition. The company chose to permanently relocate to San Antonio because of a larger talent pool for potential employees, increased protection from hurricanes, and office space that is considered to be cost-efficient.

By March 2009 the company purchased the Concord Plaza development from HDG Mansur. According to Whataburger officials, the company chose Concord Plaza due to proximity to neighborhoods and schools attractive to employees and proximity to San Antonio International Airport. Tesoro, which leased space in the development, was moving to another facility at the time Whataburger bought the building. The company planned to move 250 jobs in the corporate sector to San Antonio, with over 60% of the employees coming from Corpus Christi and the remainder hired locally.

What-A-Burger and similar stores

Whataburger is sometimes confused with the What-A-Burger (hyphenated) chain of family-operated restaurants in Virginia, North Carolina, and South Carolina. The first What-A-Burger store opened in 1950 by entrepreneur Jack Branch near Newport News, Virginia, at Newport News Circle (intersection of Jefferson Avenue and U.S. Route 258) in the former Warwick County. Branch's first location preceded the first Texas Whataburger restaurant slightly; the move took place after a modernization project involving the traffic circle. What-A-Burger and Whataburger were unaware of each other's existence several states apart until around 1970, when there was some correspondence. However, no legal actions took place until 2002–2003, when both companies sued each other over the alleged trademark infringement. The Court of Appeals, in 2004, eventually decided the Texas Whataburger had a legitimate trademark; but the Virginia chain did not harm the much larger Texas-based chain in any way or any reasonable public confusion: "There is no evidence — nor can we imagine any — that consumers are currently likely to be confused about whether the burgers served by Virginia W-A-B come from Texas or Virginia."

A second restaurant chain based in North Carolina, named What-A-Burger Drive-In, owned by Eb and Michael Bost, was not a party to the lawsuit, but under case law procedures, it would also retain its name. It visibly numbered their stores starting from #1 in Kannapolis, North Carolina, to #15 in Concord, North Carolina, six of which remain in operation .

Sponsorships
Whataburger has sponsored a variety of music festivals. The company has also sponsored sports through the Whataburger Sports Complex in Kilgore, Texas, the Arizona Soccer Association, and David Starr Racing, among others.

Gallery

See also
 Whataburger Field, home of the Corpus Christi Hooks
 List of hamburger restaurants

References

Further reading

External links

 

1950 establishments in Texas
Fast-food chains of the United States
Fast-food franchises
Fast-food hamburger restaurants
Privately held companies based in Texas
Regional restaurant chains in the United States
Restaurants established in 1950
Restaurants in San Antonio
Companies based in Corpus Christi, Texas
2019 mergers and acquisitions
Texas culture
Economy of San Antonio
San Antonio
Organizations based in San Antonio